Słomczyn can refer to two different villages in the Mazovian Voivodeship, Poland:

Słomczyn, Grójec County
Słomczyn, Piaseczno County